Dimitrios Stagas (Greek: Δημήτριος Στάγκας) or Stasinopoulos (1864–1951), known as well with his nickname Kapetan Mizas was a Greek chieftain of the Macedonian Struggle.

Biography 
Stagas was born in 1864 in Kleisoura of the Kastoria region. He set up his own armed group which acted throughout the Macedonian Struggle, defending his hometown, Kleisoura, from Bulgarian raids, but also the retaliation of the Ottoman authorities. He acted in the regions of Kastoria, Verno, and Eordaia. He cooperated in several operations with Ioannis Karavitis. He was a member of the Struggle Commission of Kleisoura and the leader of the militia of Lechovo. 

He also participated in various operations in the First Balkan War as a volunteer.

He died in 1951 at the age of 86 or 87.

References 

1864 births
1951 deaths
Greek people of the Macedonian Struggle
Greek Macedonians
Macedonian revolutionaries (Greek)
Greek military personnel of the Balkan Wars

People from Kastoria (regional unit)